Aleksandr Yevgenyevich Zaikin (born 11 September 1974) is a Russian professional football coach and a former player. He is an assistant coach with FC Volga Ulyanovsk.

Club career
He played 6 seasons in the Russian Football National League for FC Lada Dimitrovgrad, FC Nosta Novotroitsk and FC Volga Ulyanovsk.

Honours
 Russian Second Division top scorer: 1995 (Zone Center, 29 goals), 2002 (Zone Povolzhye, 25 goals).

References

1974 births
Sportspeople from Ulyanovsk
Living people
Soviet footballers
Russian footballers
Association football forwards
FC Sodovik Sterlitamak players
FC Mordovia Saransk players
FC Nosta Novotroitsk players
FC Volga Ulyanovsk players
FC Dynamo Kirov players